Brian Joshua Presley (born August 18, 1977) is an American actor and director.

Career 
Presley started his career with a handful of guest appearances on television shows such as Beverly Hills, 90210, Any Day Now, and 7th Heaven.

His big break came in 2000 when he landed the role of Jack Ramsey on the soap opera Port Charles. He portrayed Jack from 2000 until Port Charles was canceled in 2003. In 2004, he produced and starred in the film Guarding Eddy. In 2006, he starred in End Game and Home of the Brave. Borderland was released in 2007.

In the film Touchback, released in April 2012, he plays a high school football star (as Presley was in real life) who suffers a career-ending injury and becomes a farmer, but later receives a second chance at athletic success.

His directorial debut The Great Alaskan Race, which he wrote, produced and starred in along with Treat Williams, Henry Thomas and Bruce Davison will premiere at the San Diego International Film Festival on October 18, 2019.

Personal life
Presley was born in Midland, Texas, 2 days after the death of Elvis Presley who Brian is unrelated to. He graduated from Jenks High School in Jenks, Oklahoma in 1996 where he was the quarterback for the state championship winning football team (1993).  He was also active in choir and show choir at Jenks High School and had the leading role in the high school's musical his senior year.

Presley was a walk-on for the University of Arkansas football team for one year. He visited Southern California, appeared in a commercial, and decided to try acting.  He attended the business school at the University of Southern California.

He is married to his Port Charles co-star Erin Hershey Presley. They have three children.

Filmography

References

External links

Freedom Films, LLC, Presley's film production company

1977 births
Living people
Male actors from Texas
American male television actors
American male film actors
People from Midland, Texas